METAS (Medical Educational Trust Association, Surat) operates as many as 30 schools, colleges, seminaries, hospitals and other healthcare institutions across India.  There are three senior colleges in the association owned and operated by the Southern Asia Division of the Seventh-day Adventist: METAS Adventist College, Surat; METAS Adventist College, Ranchi; METAS Adventist College, Nuzvid located in Surat, Gujarat; Ranchi, Jharkhand and Nuzvid, Andhra Pradesh respectively.  Courses of study include, but are not limited to: Nursing, Allied Health Professions, Business and Computer Science.  The system started in 1923 with the founding of METAS Adventist Hospital, Surat as a simple dispensary by missionary Pastor O. W. Lange.

METAS is a part of the Seventh-day Adventist education system, the world's second largest Christian school system.

History
METAS Adventist College was established in Surat in 1998. The school, college and hospital were operated as separate units and were brought together under a common umbrella  in order to cement the fragmented areas and build a solid platform for growth and development under the name Metas.

METAS Bible Seminary
 METAS Adventist Seminary, Dhanuvachapuram, Thiruvananthapuram, Kerala
 METAS Adventist Seminary, Nuzvid, Nuzvid, Andhra Pradesh
 METAS Adventist Seminary, Ibrahimpatnam, Ibrahimpatnam, Telangana
 METAS Adventist Seminary, South Bengal, Sunderbans, West Bengal
 METAS Adventist Seminary, Jaipur, Jaipur, Rajasthan
 METAS Adventist Seminary, Bidar, Bidar, Karnataka

See also

List of Seventh-day Adventist colleges and universities
Seventh-day Adventist education
Seventh-day Adventist Church
Seventh-day Adventist theology
History of the Seventh-day Adventist Church
Adventist Colleges and Universities

References

Adventist universities and colleges in India
Universities and colleges affiliated with the Seventh-day Adventist Church
Educational institutions established in 1998
1998 establishments in Gujarat